No or NO may  refer to:

English language
 Yes and no (responses)
 A determiner in noun phrases

Alphanumeric symbols 
 No (kana), a letter/syllable in Japanese script
 No symbol, displayed 🚫
 Numero sign,  a typographic symbol for the word 'number', also represented as "No." or similar variants

Geography 
 Niederösterreich (Lower Austria), abbreviated NÖ
 Norway (ISO 3166-1 country code NO)
 Norwegian language (ISO 639-1 code "no")
 .no, the internet ccTLD for Norway
 No, Denmark, a village in Denmark
 Nō, Niigata, a former town in Japan
 No Creek (disambiguation), any of several streams
 Lake No, in South Sudan
 New Orleans, Louisiana or its professional sports teams:
 New Orleans Saints of the National Football League
 New Orleans Pelicans of the National Basketball Association

Arts and entertainment

Film and television
 No (2012 film), a 2012 Chilean film
 Nô (film), a 1998 Canadian film
 Julius No, the titular character of the 1958 novel and 1962 film Dr. No

Music

Albums
 No!, a 2002 album by They Might Be Giants
 No (Boris album), 2020
 No (Old Man Gloom album), 2012

Songs
 "No" (Bulldog song), 1972
 "No" (Little Mix song), from 2021 album Between Us 
 "No" (Louane song), from her 2017 album Louane
 "No" (Meghan Trainor song), from her 2016 album Thank You
 "No" (Shakira song), from her 2005 album Fijación Oral, Vol. 1
 "No", by Jason Aldean on his album Relentless, 2007 
 "No", by De La Soul on their album The Grind Date, 2004
 "No", by Nicolas Jaar on his album Sirens, 2016
 "No", by Monrose on their album Temptation, 2006
 "No", by Moodymann on his album Moodymann, 2014
 "No", by Alanis Morissette from the Japanese edition of Havoc and Bright Lights, 2012 and featured in the Broadway musical Jagged Little Pill
 "No", by Omar Rodríguez-López on his album Equinox, 2013
 "No", by Soulfly from Soulfly (Soulfly album), 1998
 "No", by Timbiriche from Timbiriche VII, 1987
 "N.O", by BTS from their O!RUL8,2? album, 2013

Other media
 Nō or Noh, a style of Japanese theatre

Businesses and organizations
 National Offensive, a German neo-Nazi party between 1990–1992
 IATA code for the defunct Australian airline Aus-Air
 IATA code for the Italian airline Neos

Science, mathematics, and technology
 Nitric oxide (NO), a chemical compound
 Nobelium, symbol No, a chemical element
 Surreal number, class of numbers in mathematics
 Normally open, a type of electrical switch

Other uses 
 No, a transliteration of the Korean surname Roh

See also 
 List of acronyms: N#NO
 Dr. No (disambiguation)
 Nô (disambiguation)
 No, No, No (disambiguation)
 No-no (disambiguation)
 Noo (disambiguation)
 Noh (disambiguation)
 Nou (disambiguation)